Ashaiman (often wrongly spelled as "Ashiaman") is a large town in Greater Accra Region of South Ghana and is the capital of Ashaiman Municipal District, a district in Greater Accra Region. Ashaiman has population of 208,060 according to 2021 official figures.

Climate

History
Ashaiman was founded by Nii Ashai after he had moved from Tema. Ashaiman is therefore named after him meaning Ashai's town."

Ashaiman was greatly expanded by squatters who were building Tema and others who moved in to occupy government land.

Ashaiman has grown to become one of the viable destinations for business  because of the vast population that lives within the Constituency. Crime rate has declined vastly due to the influence of the current economic activities in the community.

Educational institutions

Ashaiman Senior High School was founded in September 1990 by the Provisional National Defence Council. The school began with 39 students and two teachers. Currently the school has a population of about 1,400 students and 104 teachers. Courses offered in the school include General Arts, General Science, Agriculture, Business and Visual Arts.

See also
 Railway stations in Ghana

References

Populated places in the Greater Accra Region
Squats